Secunderabad Junction (station code: SC) is a major intercity junction railway station and a commuter rail hub in the Hyderabad urban area. In the city centre, the station is in the South Central Railway zone of Indian Railways. Built in 1874 by the Nizam of Hyderabad during the British era, it was the main station of Nizam's Guaranteed State Railway until the Kacheguda railway station opened in 1916. The station was taken over by Indian Railways in 1951, when NGSR was nationalized. Its main portico and concourse are influenced by Nizamesque architecture. The station, which resembles a fort, is a tourist attraction in the twin cities of Hyderabad and Secunderabad.

It is connected by rail to all regions of India. About 170,000 passengers arrive at (or depart from) the station daily on 229 trains. On the Vijayawada–Wadi (the SCR's main line) and Secunderabad–Manmad railway lines, it is the zone headquarters of the South Central Railway and the headquarters of the SCR's Secunderabad Division. The station has received ISO-9001 certification for quality management in ticket booking, parcel and luggage booking and platform management. Indian Railways has proposed an upgrade to a world-class station, emphasising vertical expansion. It is connected to nearly all the parts of the twin cities by the Hyderabad MMTS, Telangana State Road Transport Corporation buses and the Hyderabad Metro. It is one of the top 100 booking stations in the Indian Railways.

History

Nizam era 
The station was proposed in 1870, when the Nizam of Hyderabad MIR MEHBOOB ALI KHAN SIDDIQUI ordered to construct the secundrabad railway station, the sixth Nizam of Hyderabad state decided to connect Hyderabad State with the rest of India. Nizam's Guaranteed State Railway was formed as a private company, and construction of the Secunderabad–Wadi line began that year. The line, which would connect Hyderabad with the British Raj's Great Indian Peninsula Railway main line at Wadi Junction, was funded by the Nizam.

The Secunderabad–Wadi line and the Secunderabad railway station were finished on 9 October 1874, introducing railways to Hyderabad. The station's main portico and concourse were influenced by Nizam-era architecture. Resembling a fort, it is a tourist attraction in the twin cities. Hyderabad State took over the railway in 1879. In 1871, the Secunderabad station was connected to the Singareni Collieries Company by a  line. The Secunderabad–Wadi line was extended to Vijayawada Junction as the Vijayawada–Wadi line in 1889. A broad-gauge connection between Vijayawada Junction and Chennai Central opened the following year, enabling rail travel between Hyderabad and Chennai (then Madras).

The Hyderabad–Godavari Valley Railway was established in 1900 with the opening of the Manmad–Secunderabad metre-gauge line, and merged into the NGSR in 1930. In 1916, the Kachiguda railway station was built as NGSR headquarters and to regulate traffic at Secunderabad. Diesel rail cars manufactured by Ganz were tried for the first time in Hyderabad State by the NGSR in 1939.

Indian Railways 

On 5 November 1951, Nizam's Guaranteed State Railway was nationalized by the government of India and merged into the government-owned Indian Railways (IR) as part of the Ministry of Railways. The Secunderabad station was assigned to the Central Railway zone, with Victoria Terminus its headquarters. In 1966, the South Central Railway zone was formed with Secunderabad its headquarters (as well as the headquarters of Indian Railways' Secunderabad Division. Rail Nilayam (the zone headquarters) was built in 1972, and the division headquarters was built in 1980.

The Indian Railways Institute of Signal Engineering and Telecommunications (IRISET), one of IR's six centralised training institutes, was established in Secunderabad by the Ministry of Railways on 24 November 1957. to address the specialised training needs of railway staff and officers in railway signalling and telecommunications. In 1967, the Ajanta Express was introduced between Kachiguda and Manmad via Secunderabad. The Secunderabad–Vijayawada Junction Golconda Express was introduced in 1969. In February 1978, the Secunderabad Division was split into two divisions: Secunderabad and Hyderabad.

Although an early computerised reservation system began at Secunderabad in July 1989, the 30 September 1989 introduction of SCR's computerised Passenger Reservation System (PRS) at the station made reservations easier. The system, later linked to New Delhi (1997), Howrah (1998), Mumbai and Chennai (both 1999), preceded the CONCERT reservation system which was developed at Secunderabad in September 1994 and implemented in January 1995.

The Secunderabad–Mahbubnagar metre-gauge section was converted to broad gauge in 1993, breaking an important north–south metre-gauge freight connection north from Secunderabad. That year, the Secunderabad station was electrified towards Kazipet and Vijayawada Junction. The electric-locomotive shed in South Lallaguda (near the Secunderabad station), with a capacity of 100 locomotives, was built in 1995.

21st century 

The Rajdhani Express, which connects India's state capitals with New Delhi (the national capital), was proposed in Andhra Pradesh between Secunderabad and the Hazrat Nizamuddin railway station in the 2001 Indian rail budget. The Secunderabad Rajdhani Express was introduced on 27 February 2002. The Hyderabad Multi-Modal Transport System (MMTS), the state's first of its kind, was introduced in 2003 with two lines: –Hyderabad railway station (initially 13 trains daily) and Lingampally– Secunderabad (11 trains daily). Another line was built between Secunderabad and Falaknuma railway station. SCR operated the last metre-gauge train on the Nizamabad–Manoharabad line on 30 June 2004, ending metre-gauge service (which began during the 1930s on the Secunderabad–Manmad line of the NGSR) to facilitate IR's broad-gauge track-conversion program. The line was open by 7 February 2005 after the conversion, permitting railway traffic on the Secunderabad–Manmad stretch of the Kachiguda–Manmad line.

SCR introduced the Himalaya Special freight train at Secunderabad on 7 November 2007. The 2008–2009 Rail Budget provided for Secunderabad to upgrade to a world-class station. SCR's first Duronto Express, between Secunderabad and Hazrat Nizamuddin railway station, was flagged off by then Andhra Pradesh Chief Minister Konijeti Rosaiah at Secunderabad on 14 March 2010.

Station 

Secunderabad is one of India's largest and busiest railway stations. The main railway terminus and a commuter hub in the Hyderabad urban area (the capital of Telangana), it is one of three major stations serving the city; the other two are Kacheguda and the Hyderabad Deccan railway station.

The station is the zone headquarters of South Central Railway and the headquarters of the Secunderabad Division. It is the busiest railway station in the state and SCR's Second-largest junction, after Vijayawada Junction. To reduce traffic at Secunderabad, the Railway Board has decided on a fourth major station in Hyderabad. There are two proposals for the new terminal:  and Moula-Ali.

Secunderabad Station has a standard station layout. All its tracks are broad-gauge and electrified. The Secunderabad–Manmad line is non-electrified, however, so diesel trains are common.

The station has 10 platforms, which are covered by a reinforced concrete roof. Each platform can handle a train with more than 24 coaches. There is an additional track between platforms seven and eight, which is a service track for the Hyderabad Multi-Modal Transport System and suburban trains (where two trains halt at the same platform, due to their short length). Platforms six and seven are divided in two (6A and B and 7A and B).

Platform use is:
 1 and 2: Long distance, inter-city express trains, such as the Rajdhani Express, Garib Rath Express, and Telangana Express
 3–5: Inter-city express trains with fewer passengers; most are regional trains.
 6A,6B and 7A,7B: Hyderabad MMTS and suburban rail
 8: Regional and some mail express trains
 9: Special trains or other trains at peak hours
 10: High-speed, long-distance express trains

Secunderabad is a junction of tracks from four directions:
 Kachiguda–Kurnool–Guntakal–Bangalore
 Malkajgiri–Bolaram–––Parbhani
 Hyderabad Deccan–Wadi
 Bibinagar–Kazipet

The Vijayawada Junction–Wadi line is the only electrified line.

Service 

The station is serviced by an average of 229 Inter-city and suburban rail trains daily. Most trains originate or terminate at Secunderabad. The Vijayawada–Wadi line, which passes through the station, is one of SCR's busiest lines. It is also an IR freight station. Its Freight Operation Information System monitors freight movement.

Secunderabad is served by a number of lines:
 Secunderabad–Repalle
 Secunderabad– line (the Kacheguda–Manmad section)
 Vijayawada–Wadi line

Inter-city 
It is one of Indian Railways' busiest stations. About 170,000 passengers use Secunderabad daily on over 200 trains. The Secunderabad Rajdhani Express, between Secunderabad and the Hazrat Nizamuddin railway station, was introduced on 27 February 2002. Another daily Rajdhani Express, originating at the Bangalore City railway station, also stops at Secunderabad. Several Garib Rath Express trains stop at the station, including the daily Visakhapatnam–Secunderabad Garib Rath Express and a train to Yeswanthpur in Bangalore. The non-stop Duronto Express was introduced between Secunderabad and Hazrat Nizamuddin.

All inter-city rail service is operated by Indian Railways. The bi-weekly Secunderabad–Mumbai Duronto Express, announced in the 2010–11 Union Railway Budget, was expected to begin by 31 March 2011. Most inter-city service operate to Vijayawada Junction, Guntur Junction, Tenali, Visakhapatnam, Howrah station, Chennai Central and Bangalore. The greatest passenger volume is between Secunderabad and Visakhapatnam. The Godavari Express and Gowthami Express are SCR's most prestigious trains.

Commuter rail 

Secunderabad is the only station in the Hyderabad MMTS to connect to all four MMTS commuter lines, and is the system's commuter inter-change hub. The station is on Lines 2 and 3 of the Hyderabad Metro. Secunderabad East metro station, on the blue line, is near Secunderabad Junction.

Secunderabad Station is also the hub of suburban transit trains (push-pull trains). These DHMU's run in the non-electrified rail lines in the suburbs of the Hyderabad Urban Area. These also run in the electrified lines of MMTS).

The following Hyderabad MMTS lines originate at (or pass through) Secunderabad:
 Hyderabad–Falaknuma route (FN line)
 Secunderabad–Falaknuma route (FS line)
 Secunderabad–Bolarum route (BS line)

Facilities 

Secunderabad has a number of passenger facilities, including modern security and parking. A coach depot for cleaning and maintenance is next to the station. The area around the station is sometimes congested. The station has restaurants, cafes, a coffee shop, book stalls, waiting and cloak rooms, a cyber cafe, tourism agents' and train-inquiry counters, digital train-status boards, train-status announcements and foot bridges. A pharmacy has a dispensary and first-aid kit.

Three waiting rooms are at the station's north entrance, and two are at the south entrance. An air-conditioned waiting room is on platform 1, and a non-air-conditioned dormitory is on the first floor. The air-conditioned waiting room is free of charge for passengers with air-conditioned-class tickets. The latest dormitory would supplement the existing air-conditioned dormitory with eight beds and 13 rooms, each with two beds.

Both south-entrance waiting rooms, on platform 10, are air-conditioned. Intended for upper- and second-class passengers, they have comfortable chairs and pay toilets. Nearly 11,000 passengers use the waiting rooms daily.

Secunderabad is well-stocked with security equipment (including CCTVs, door-frame metal detectors and hand-held sensors) and security personnel. Forty-five fixed and pan–tilt–zoom cameras are installed throughout the station, equipped with internet-enabled digital video recorders and interconnected display monitors. The PTZ cameras can rotate 360 degrees, and have a range of one kilometre. The system is controlled at the station's Railway Protection Force post.

RPF personnel are also available to monitor suspicious activity, and nine surveillance cameras were installed at the station after the 13 September 2008 Delhi bombings. Indian Railways plan to equip a commando outfit modeled on the National Security Guard to counter terrorism at the station.

After increasing terrorist threats, SCR began baggage checks at an estimated cost of 40 lakh (4 million, or US$65,000) as part of a pilot project. To increase security, railway authorities introduced an integrated security system as part of the 2009 Rail Budget.

On 14 July 2008, a caller rang up the police main control room around 10:30 a.m. and said that bombs had been placed at the railway station, passport office, and a Secunderabad bus stop. Between 1:00 and 1:15 p.m on 15 July, four smoke bombs were said to be about to go off on platforms one, six and seven. Railway authorities immediately alerted the EMRI 108 service in what was a drill.

An actual bomb threat was phoned in to the Cyberabad Metropolitan Police branch of the Hyderabad City Police on 8 October 2009, which kept police in suspense for two hours. The caller, who spoke in Telugu, told a telephone operator that a bomb had been planted in the railway station and would explode within an hour. The CMP police alerted their Hyderabad counterparts, who rushed to the station and began a search for explosives. Local police, bomb-disposal squads and railway police scoured the entire station (and its trains) but found nothing, and the call was declared a hoax.

The station has a large car and motorcycle parking lot, and an auto rickshaw stand is at the station entrance. The south entrance has a taxi stand for municipal and private taxis. Secunderabad is India's first railway station with an automated parking system. The lot, built at a cost of 6 million, has a dispenser at its entrance to issue a magnetically-striped ticket with the time and date of arrival. A manual pay station is at the exit.

Secunderabad Junction has two ticket counters. Passengers can buy second- and general-class tickets on the train, since they are not reservable. A computerized reservation facility is provided, and an information counter for tourists. A Passenger Operated Enquiry Terminal (POET) is available, which can access the National Train Enquiry System (NTES). Indrail Passes are available at the reservation center, about 200 meters from the station.

To conserve water, SCR installed a 12-million water-reclamation plant at the station. Station maintenance, including cleaning 800 coaches, aprons and platforms, requires over 30,000 litres of water daily. With the water-recycling plant, used water is collected and sent to the plant for biological and chemical treatment. The non-drinkable, recycled water is then used to clean coaches and platforms.

Future 

During the 2008–09 Indian Railways budget session, Railway Minister Lalu Prasad Yadav unveiled a design to improve the two-century-old Secunderabad Junction station at an estimated cost of 40 billion (est.$1 billion). In the 2009–10 budget hearing, Mamata Banerjee listed 50 stations (including Secunderabad) to upgrade to world-class facilities. Chief Minister Y.S. Rajasekhara Reddy proposed developing the Gandhi Hospital land adjoining the station along the lines of Toronto's Union Station, which was developed into a major commuter terminus, a commercial hub and a parking facility.

Similar to an airport, the proposed station would have a shopping mall, a food plaza, entertainment and recreation centres. The plan includes vertical expansion of the station, with platforms on several floors connected by escalators and lifts. Separation of arriving and departing commuters and integration of the proposed integrated bus terminus (IBT) and metro service will be key ingredients of the upgrade. The station's current security apparatus might be overhauled. Lighting, seating areas, waiting rooms, bathrooms and Internet kiosks would be upgraded.

Since about 170,000 passengers commute through Secunderabad on 229 trains daily, the project needs to be developed with an eye to the next century; Union Railway Minister Mamata Banerjee concurred in June 2009, when she presented the maiden 2009–10 Rail Budget.
Preservationists fear that the massive upgrade may leave the heritage building a memory of a bygone era, since 85 million has already been spent on station improvements.

A series of meetings was convened with Railway Board authorities in July 2009. It was decided to hire a consultant to sketch a master plan for the project, including facilities to be incorporated, a time frame and estimated cost. Global tenders for consultants were issued on 26 September, and the successful bidder (who would have ten months to propose a master plan) would be selected on 30 October. The request for tender deadline was extended to 24 December and then indefinitely, due to a lack of bidders.

The station's south side is planned for development with a number of facilities. A new building is being designed with four floors, of which the first and second have been completed at a cost of 22 million. In the 2009–10 Rail Budget, Union Railway Minister Mamata Banerjee introduced a non-stop Duronto Express from Secunderabad to .Very Recently A major step for the development of Secunderabad Railway station has been taken with the floating of tender for its upgradation at an estimated cost of ₹653 crore on Saturday.

See also 

 Nizam's Guaranteed State Railway
 South Central Railway zone
 Transport in Hyderabad
 Hyderabad Deccan railway station
 Begumpet railway station
 Vande Bharat Express

References

External links 

 Indian Railways website

1874 establishments in India
MMTS stations in Hyderabad
Railway junction stations in Telangana
Railway stations in Hyderabad district, India
Railway stations opened in 1874
Secunderabad railway division
Transport in Secunderabad